Toja Ellison ( Černe, born 4 July 1993) is a Slovenian compound archer. At the 2019 European Games held in Minsk, Belarus, she won the gold medal in the women's individual compound event.

Career 

In 2017, she won the silver medal in the women's individual compound event at the World Games held in Wrocław, Poland.

In 2019, alongside Staš Modic, she won a silver medal in the mixed team event at the Archery World Cup in Berlin. In 2020, she finished in 14th place in the women's compound event at The Vegas Shoot held in Las Vegas, United States. She also competed in the inaugural Lockdown Knockout tournament organised by World Archery without winning a medal.

In 2021, she lost her bronze medal match in the women's individual compound event at the World Archery Championships held in Yankton, United States. She also competed in the mixed team event.

She lost her bronze medal match in the women's individual compound event at the 2022 World Games held in Birmingham, Alabama, United States.

Personal life 

Ellison was born and raised in Ljubljana, Slovenia. In April 2016, she married recurve archer Brady Ellison.

References

External links 

 

Living people
1993 births
Slovenian female archers
Sportspeople from Ljubljana
Archers at the 2019 European Games
European Games medalists in archery
European Games gold medalists for Slovenia
Competitors at the 2017 World Games
Competitors at the 2022 World Games
World Games silver medalists
World Games medalists in archery
20th-century Slovenian women
21st-century Slovenian women